Canis ferox (Latin: canis: dog, ferox: fierce; hence fierce dog) is a species of canid which was endemic to North America and lived during the Late Miocene and Early Pliocene. Existing nearly 6 million years ago, this animal is thought to be an ancestor of the modern day coyote.

Evolution 
Canis ferox marks the beginning of the cladogenesis of the genus Canis. However, this species had other characteristics similar to Eucyon davisi, belonging to a different genus of canids. While C. ferox first lived in North America, the Late Miocene marked the start of its dispersal to Europe and Asia. The dispersal of canids and eucyons does correlate to the increase in animal life and species richness in the area, but the diversity of the canid groups peaked at the same time as the turnover. In Asia, this peak was throughout the Pliocene Era.

Morphological traits 
The first partial fossil was found in Rancho Viejo, Guanajuato (Mexico). These fossils consisted of partial maxilla, mandible, vertebrae, shoulder blade, ulna, and phalanges, with nearly complete humeri and skull. Based on the found fossils, researchers estimated that this species was about the size of a female coyote but stronger and wider. It is estimated that their weight could be between 13.3 kg and 14.3 kg, based on the Legendre and Roth correlations. Paleontologists Miller and Carranza-Castaneda noted that the skull of this species resembled that of an ancestral coyote, Canis lepophagus.

References

Wolves
Prehistoric canines
Prehistoric mammals of North America
Pleistocene carnivorans
Fossil taxa described in 1998